Taher Mohamed Ahmed Taher Mohamed Mahmoud (born 7 March 1997) is an Egyptian professional footballer, who plays for Egyptian club Al Ahly and the Egypt national team as a winger.

Profile 
Taher started his early career in the Arab Contractors FC at age eight when he first joined the elder team of 96; he achieved the best player trophy in 2009, 2010, and 2012. In 2008, he participated with the Arab Contractors 1996 team in the Danone Nations cup held in Paris, where he showed a very high performance; in this competition, the famous Tunisian legend Al Zubair Baya announced on the Al Jazeera Satellite channel that he should be nominated as the best player in the championship. The French Legend Zinedine Zidane signed his T-shirt when he lost the title.

In 2013 the Arab Contractors FC "Mountain Wolves" head coach, Mohamed Radwan, selected him to join the first team as the youngest Egyptian Football player in the Egyptian premier league. He played his first official match against Al Ahly FC, "African Club of the Century," and his team won. Taher was trained by Egyptian trainer Hassan Shehata.

Taher joined every youth national team, starting with the 1995 Team under Alaa Maihoub, and the Olympic Team, under Hossam El Badry. He currently is the leader of the 1997 Team under Moatemed Gamal, who succeeded in qualifying for the African Nations Cup next year in Zambia. He scored the effective goal in Rwanda, giving the young Pharos an edge.

Taher finished his IB certificate in 2015 at his elite French School "Ecole Oasis" helping secure his career as a recognized footballer, during schooling he participated with his school in three main football events starting in 2008, where the school team won the competition of International schools held in Cairo with two personal titles: 'Best Player' and 'Top Scorer'. In 2012 the school crossed borders in the Mediterranean Cup held in Verona, Italy, where Taher achieved the title of 'Best Player in the Competition'. In 2013, the school team achieved the Silver Medal in the Valencia cup held in Spain.

In 2016 Taher started his first European transfer to Le Havre FC being, a one-year loan; the transfer was under the auspices of the Club Head Coach, Bob Bradley, who had the will to be having the player's efforts for one year, specially the club was competing to be upgraded to the French league 1st. Division as a target of the head coach. 

In 2017/18, Taher, upon the request of the Arab Contractors FC, returned to his club as the club management objective for the season was to compete for the championship to return the club's trophies and victories being one of the top leading clubs in the African continent after suffering for several years.

Taher started this season 19/20 strongly with his club, the news is still informing that the player is under the focus of Al Ahly club, and Zamalek FC is still planning to achieve his services.

The new Mo Salah, as the local press describes him (and he is known as) Il Magico and the future of Egyptian football.

On 9 July, Al Ahly announced that they signed Taher Mohamed from Arab Contractors on a five-year deal with a fee of £E40m.

International
He made his debut for Egypt national football team on 16 November 2018 in an Africa Cup of Nations qualifier against Tunisia, as an 86th-minute substitute for Amr Warda.
Taher was among the final list of the Egyptian Olympic team that won the latest African cup held in Cairo in November 2019 and succeeded in qualifying to Tokyo 2020

International press 
In September 2016, US ESPN selected Taher Mohamed among the top 10 world football players eligible to rise with their national teams to the World Cup in Russia 2018.

Honours

Al Ahly
 Egypt Cup: 2019–20
 CAF Champions League: 2020–21
 CAF Super Cup: 2021 (May), 2021 (Dec)
 Egyptian Super Cup: 2021–22
 FIFA Club World Cup: Third-Place 2020, Third-Place 2021

References

External links
 

1997 births
Living people
Footballers from Cairo
Le Havre AC players
Egyptian footballers
Association football midfielders
Egypt international footballers
Egyptian expatriate footballers
Expatriate footballers in France
Egypt youth international footballers
Ligue 2 players
Egyptian Premier League players
Al Mokawloon Al Arab SC players
Al Ahly SC players
Footballers at the 2020 Summer Olympics
Olympic footballers of Egypt